Barisha is a residential and very old locality of Kolkata (Calcutta) in West Bengal, India. It is under Behala area and divided as Paschim Barisha and Purba Barisha.

Location 

The Barisha area is composed of Behala Chowrasta, Janakalyan, Silpara, Sakherbazar and Thakurpukur.

The area borders Behala towards north, Joka towards south, Sarsuna and Dakshin Behala toward West, and Haridevpur, Siriti, Tollygunge towards east.

See also 
 History of Kolkata

References

External links 
 Sabarna Prithivi - The Official website of the Sabarna Roy Choudhury Paribar Parishad
 

Neighbourhoods in Kolkata